This is a list of on-air personalities from the professional wrestling television series WWE's Raw. On-air personalities include the wrestlers themselves, ring announcers, commentators, and on-screen authority figures. The show also features recurring on-air segments hosted by various personalities.

Authority figures 

{|class="sortable wikitable" style="font-size: 85%;"
|-
!Authority figures || Position || Date started || Date finished || Notes
|-
|Jack Tunney
|President
|
|
|Was President before Raw began production. Forced out by Vince McMahon.
|-
|Mr. McMahon
|OwnerChairman of the Board 
|
|
|Was owner before Raw began production. Was not known onscreen as owner until late 1996. Co-owner with Ric Flair from November 19, 2001 to June 10, 2002.
|-
|Gorilla Monsoon
|President
|
|
|Relinquished role because of declining health and on January 29, 1996 Roddy Piper was named interim WWF President because Vader attacked Gorila Monsoon (leave of absence). Title was retired.
|-
|Sgt. Slaughter
|Commissioner
|
|
|Relinquished role to Shawn Michaels.
|-
|Shawn Michaels
|Commissioner
|
|
|Relinquished role to Mick Foley.
|-
|Mick Foley
|Commissioner
|
|
|Fired by Mr. McMahon.
|-
|Debra
|Lieutenant Commissioner
|
|
|Resigned as Lieutenant Commissioner on the March 5 episode of Raw to pursue managing again.
|-
|William Regal
|Commissioner
|
|
|Fired by Linda McMahon for joining The Alliance
|-
|Mick Foley
|Commissioner
|
|
|Decided to leave the company.
|-
|Ric Flair
|Owner
|
|
|Lost his position as per stipulation in a match against Mr. McMahon
|-
|Eric Bischoff
|General manager
|
|
|The WWE Board of Directors appointed Steve Austin as Co-General Manager of Raw after Bischoff repeatedly abused his power, Retained his role as general manager of Raw after his team defeated Steve Austin's team at in a Survivor Series elimination match at Survivor Series.
|-
|Chief Morley
|Chief of Staff to the General Manager/Co-General Managers
|
|
|Fired by Co-General Manager Eric Bischoff for losing in a singles match against commentator Jerry Lawler, but rehired by Steve Austin to return to his Val Venis wrestling gimmick.
|-
|Eric Bischoff and Steve Austin
|Co-General Managers
|
|
|Austin lost his position of Co-GM after his team lost to Bischoff's team at Survivor Series.
|-
|Eric Bischoff and Mick Foley
|Co-General Managers
|
|
|Mick Foley walked out on a match with Randy Orton for the WWE Intercontinental Championship and gave up the position as Co-GM based on the match stipulations.
|-
|Eric Bischoff
|General manager
|
|
|
|-
|Steve Austin
|Self-Proclaimed "Sheriff" with full General Manager powers
|
|
|
|-
|Theodore Long
|Interim General Manager
|colspan="2" style="text-align:center;" | 
|Made GM for one night only by General Manager Eric Bischoff.
|-
|Eric Bischoff
|General manager
|colspan="2" style="text-align:center;" | 
|Steve Austin served as "Sheriff" periodically through Bischoff's term. 
|-
|Jonathan Coachman
|Interim General Manager
|colspan="2" style="text-align:center;" | 
|Made GM for one night only by General Manager Eric Bischoff.
|-
|Eric Bischoff
|General manager
|
|
|Steve Austin served as "Sheriff" periodically through Bischoff's term. 
|-
|Johnny Blaze/Spade/Nitro
|Assistant to the General Manager
|
|
|Fired by General Manager Eric Bischoff after losing a singles match against his nephew Eugene.
|-
|Eugene
|Interim General Manager
|colspan="2" style="text-align:center;" | 
|Made GM for one night only by General Manager Eric Bischoff. 
|-
|Eric Bischoff
|General manager
|
|
|
|-
|Maven
|Interim General Manager
|colspan="2" style="text-align:center;" | 
|Made himself GM for one night only while General Manager Eric Bischoff was on vacation.
|-
|Chris Benoit
|Interim General Manager
|colspan="2" style="text-align:center;" | 
|Made himself GM for one night only while General Manager Eric Bischoff was on vacation.
|-
|Randy Orton
|Interim General Manager
|colspan="2" style="text-align:center;" | 
|Made himself GM for one night only while General Manager Eric Bischoff was on vacation.
|-
|Chris Jericho
|Interim General Manager
|colspan="2" style="text-align:center;" | 
|Made himself GM for one night only while General Manager Eric Bischoff was on vacation.
|-
|Eric Bischoff
|General manager
|
|
|Fired by Mr. McMahon in December 2005 when he was tossed into the garbage truck.
|-
|Mr. McMahon
|Interim General Manager
|
|
|
|-
|The Spirit Squad
|Interim General Managers
|colspan="2" style="text-align:center;" | 
|Made GMs for one night only by Interim General Manager Mr. McMahon due to their help in his match against Shawn Michaels at Backlash.
|-
|Vince McMahon|Mr. McMahon
|Interim General Manager
|
|
|Decided to not become Interim General Manager anymore.
|-
|D-Generation X
|Interim General Managers
|colspan="2" style="text-align:center;" | 
|DX took over Raw for the night after they put Jonathan Coachman in a garbage bin and wheeled him away.
|-
|Eric Bischoff
|Interim General Manager
|colspan="2" style="text-align:center;" | 
|Granted GM powers for one night only after the refereeing job he did at Cyber Sunday by Mr. McMahon.
|-
|Michael Peña
|Interim General Manager
|colspan="2" style="text-align:center;" | 
|Made GM for one night only by Mick Foley.
|-
|Jonathan Coachman
|General manager
|
|
|Served as "Executive Assistant" from May 2006 to June 2007 and from August 2007 to January 2008.
|-
|William Regal
|Interim General Manager
|colspan="2" style="text-align:center;" | 
|Made GM for one night only by Executive Assistant and Acting GM Jonathan Coachman.
|-
|Jonathan Coachman
|General manager
|
|
|Served as "Executive Assistant" from May 2006 to June 2007 and from August 2007 to January 2008.
|-
|William Regal
|General manager
|
|
|Lost his position as general manager due to being fired by Mr. McMahon after losing a match to Mr. Kennedy. Jonathan Coachman served as executive assistant from August 2007 to January 2008.
|-
|John Cena
|Interim General Manager
|colspan="2" style="text-align:center;" | 
|GM William Regal granted him the right to book matches for himself and his opponents, with control rotating over 3 weeks.
|-
|Randy Orton
|Interim General Manager
|colspan="2" style="text-align:center;" | 
|GM William Regal granted him the right to book matches for himself and his opponents, with control rotating over 3 weeks.
|-
|Triple H
|Interim General Manager
|colspan="2" style="text-align:center;" | 
|GM William Regal granted him the right to book matches for himself and his opponents, with control rotating over 3 weeks.
|-
|William Regal
|General manager
|
|
|Lost his position as general manager due to being fired by Mr. McMahon after losing a match to Mr. Kennedy. 
|-
|Mike Adamle
|General manager
|
|
|
|-
|Chris Jericho
|Interim General Manager
|colspan="2" style="text-align:center;" | 
|Adamle was called away to a meeting with Shane and Stephanie McMahon. Adamle named him the Acting GM for the night.
|-
|Mike Adamle
|General manager
|
|
|Resigned in November 2008.
|-
|Shane McMahon and Stephanie McMahon
|Co-General Managers
|
|
|Control reverted to the McMahons.The position was then claimed by Stephanie McMahon.
|-
|Stephanie McMahon
|General manager
|
|
|Took leave of absence on February 23, 2009.Vickie Guerrero served as "Interim General Manager" until April 2009.
|-
|Vickie Guerrero
|General manager
|
|
|Opted to fully take over the position on Raw and resigned as general manager of SmackDown.Resigned in June 2009.
|-
|Donald Trump
|Owner
|
|
|It was announced that Trump had purchased the Raw franchise from Mr. McMahon on June 15, 2009.
|-
|Mr. McMahon
|Owner, Chairman, and CEO
|
|
|
|-
|Various guest hosts
|Guest Host
|
|
|An initiative established during Donald Trump's brief period of ownership.The guest host position held authoritative control over the brand until May 10, 2010.
|-
|Vickie Guerrero
|General manager
|
|
|Resigned following the first day of tenure.
|-
|Bret Hart
|General manager
|
|
|Removed of position by Mr. McMahon.
|-
|Anonymous Raw General Manager (revealed to be Hornswoggle)
|General manager
|
|
|Communications from the general manager were received via email through a laptop on a podium and occasionally Michael Cole's iPad. The General Manager stopped sending emails when Triple H became COO. The laptop and podium were removed after October 2, 2011.On the July 9, 2012 edition, it was revealed that Hornswoggle was behind the gimmick.
|-
|Triple H
|Chief Operating Officer (Storyline)
|
|
|The Board of Directors removed Vince McMahon from day to day power and handed the duties to his son-in-law. However, his authoritative control powers as general manager of running Raw are no longer needed and still remained as COO (see below).Lost position in November 2014 after The Authority lost at Survivor Series.Triple H also served as Executive Vice-president of Talent, Live Events and Creative.
|-
|Theodore Long
|Assistant to the COO
|
|
|Long was appointed by COO Triple H to aid him in running Raw Supershows, due to his being General Manager of SmackDown.
|-
|John Laurinaitis
|General manager
|
|
|Won position, Team Johnny vs Team Teddy at WrestleMania XXVIII. Fired at No Way Out by Mr. McMahon as per pre-match stipulation when John Cena defeated Big Show in a Steel cage match. Laurinaitis also served as Executive Vice-president of Talent Relations.
|-
|David Otunga
|Legal Advisor
|
|
|Lost the position following Laurinaitis' firing.
|-
|Theodore Long
|Assistant to the General Manager
|
|
|Became Laurinaitis' assistant after Team Teddy lost to Team Johnny at WrestleMania XXVIII.
|-
|Eve Torres
|Executive Administrator
|
|
|Lost the position following Laurinaitis' firing.
|-
|Interim General Managers
|Guest GM
|
|
|Following Laurinaitis' firing, the Board of Directors would invite past Raw GMs and Commissioners to run both Raw and SmackDown on a weekly basis until a new full-time GM is named.
|-
|AJ Lee
|General manager
|
|
|Was named the new Raw GM by Mr. McMahon. Was forced to step down due to allegations of fraternizing with an unnamed superstar, later revealed to be John Cena by Vickie Guerrero.
|-
|Vickie Guerrero
|Managing Supervisor
|
|
|Mr. McMahon named Guerrero as the Managing Supervisor after AJ Lee resigned. Fired on July 8, 2013 edition of Raw after failing a performance evaluation by the McMahons.
|-
|Brad Maddox
|Assistant to the Managing Supervisor
|
|
|Named by Guerrero as a reward for revealing that Paul Heyman and CM Punk were working with The Shield. Was promoted to General Manager after Vickie Guerrero failed her performance evaluation.
|-
|Brad Maddox
|General manager
|
|
|Named by Mr. McMahon on the July 8 edition of Raw. Fired on May 26, 2014 edition of Raw for not following Triple H's orders.
|-
|Stephanie McMahon
|Minority Owner/Chief Brand Officer
|
|
|Was relieved of her duties due to Shane McMahon running the show.
|-
|Kane
|Director of operations
|
|
|Not officially announced until Michael Cole conducted an interview with Triple H uploaded onto WWE.com and YouTube on November 6, 2013.Lost position after losing to Team Cena at Survivor Series 2014 where the stipulation stated that The Authority would lose power if they lost. Kane would eventually lose his job for good after losing at Hell in a Cell 2015 in a match which put Seth Rollins' title against Kane's job.
|-
|John Cena/Guest hosts/Anonymous Raw General Manager
|General managers/Coordinator
|
|
|The concept returned after The Authority briefly lost power at Survivor Series. The concept ended when John Cena brought back The Authority on the December 29, 2014 episode of Raw.  
|-
|Triple H
|Chief Operating Officer (Storyline)
|
|2019
|Stephanie McMahon announced that Triple H would return to the WWE as the COO.
|-
|Shane McMahon
|General manager
|
|
|Mr. McMahon originally put Shane in charge of Raw for one night only following the loss inside Hell in a Cell match against The Undertaker at WrestleMania. However, due to overwhelming social media support, Shane was put in charge of Raw once again.  
|-
|Shane McMahon and Stephanie McMahon
|Co-General Managers
|
|
|Mr. McMahon announced at Payback that Shane and Stephanie would both share control of Raw.  
|-
|Stephanie McMahon
|Commissioner
|
|
|Mr. McMahon announced on Raw that Stephanie, Triple H, Shane and himself to leave charge of Raw and SmackDown to shake things up.
|-
|Mick Foley
|General manager
|
|
|Stephanie announced Foley as her General Manager for Raw prior to the 2016 WWE draft. Fired on the March 20, 2017 episode.
|-
|Kurt Angle
|General manager
|
|
|Mr. McMahon announced Angle as the new general manager on the April 3, 2017 episode of Raw. Dean Ambrose and The Miz served as co-General Managers for one night only on the May 8, 2017 episode of Raw.When the McMahons (Vince, Stephanie, Shane, and Triple H) announced on the December 17, 2018 edition of Raw that, as a united group, they were taking over both Raw and SmackDown, Angle was effectively removed as general manager.
|-
| rowspan="2" |Baron Corbin
|Constable
|
|
|Stephanie McMahon appointed Corbin as Constable of Raw, becoming her personal representative. Lost his position after losing to Braun Strowman at the eponymous match of the 2018 TLC : Tables, Ladders & Chairs event.
|-
|Acting General Manager
|
|
|Was named acting General Manager by McMahon after she sent Kurt Angle home on vacation on the August 20, 2018 episode of Raw.
|-
|Alexa Bliss
|Supervisor of the Women's Division
|
|
|Was declared the Supervisor of the Women's Division by General Manager-elect Baron Corbin.When the McMahons (Vince, Stephanie, Shane, and Triple H) announced on the December 17, 2018 edition of Raw that, as a united group, they were taking over both Raw and SmackDown, Bliss was effectively removed as Supervisor of the Women's Division.
|-
|Sonya Deville
|WWE Official
|
|
|Began appearing as the assistant to on-screen authority figure Adam Pearce on the January 1, 2021 edition of SmackDown, later appearing on the Raw brand in the same role. Deville eventually began making questionable and blatantly self-serving decisions which led to Pearce terminating her contract as a WWE Official on the May 9, 2022 edition of Raw.
|-
|Adam Pearce
|WWE Official
||Present'|Since January 2020, Pearce has been the main on-screen WWE Authority Figure for Raw and Smackdown, making the vast majority of the matches and presiding over issues needing resolution from management.
|}

 Commentators 

 Following the departure of Bobby Heenan on the December 6, 1993 edition of Raw, Vince McMahon was joined by various guest commentators until March 7, 1994 when Randy Savage became the permanent color commentator. Randy Savage would remain part of the commentary team until October, 1994 when he left the World Wrestling Federation for World Championship Wrestling. Post Savage's departure, Vince McMahon was once again accompanied by guest commentators until the December 5, 1994 edition of Raw when Shawn Michaels became the permanent color commentator.

 Honky filled in due to Lawler having a match during the beginning of the show and remain out for rest of the show.
 Midway through the WWE Intercontinental Championship match.
 From December 1997-July 1998, Jim Ross served as color commentator for the first hour, and play by play commentator for the second hour of Raw Is War, with the Michael Cole tandem as play by play commentator (later just Cole), and Kevin Kelly as the alternate color commentator for the first hour ("Raw"), with Jerry Lawler taking over for the second hour ("The War Zone").
 Filled in for Jerry Lawler who was absent due to the premiere of Man on the Moon.
 Ventura called the main event.
 Defeated Jerry Lawler and Jim Ross in a tag team match at Unforgiven to become the announce team for Raw. The following week, Jim Ross defeated Jonathan Coachman to win his and Jerry Lawler's jobs back.
 When Joey Styles quits the WWE in storyline, Todd Grisham fills in for him to call the main event.
 Mathews became the alternate color commentator on Raw beginning December 27, 2010, due to Lawler's increased in-ring schedule (Lawler would continue as commentator when he was not wrestling). On March 14, 2011, Raw began using a full-time three man team with Michael Cole announcing from his own separate table ("The Cole Mine"). Ross has also returned to the broadcast table since making his broadcast return at WrestleMania XXVII and the four announcers worked in rotating three man shifts. This ended on the May 23, 2011 edition of Raw when Michael Cole returned to the normal announce table.
 Filled in for Jerry Lawler, who was recovering from injury.
 Filled in for Jerry Lawler, who was recovering from a heart attack.
 Ross sat in for Michael Cole, who allowed him to call the main event.
 JBL was absent at the time, so only Cole and Lawler called the event.
 Lawler was sick during the day, so only Cole and JBL called the event.
 Filled in for Michael Cole, JBL, and Booker T after they were assaulted by Brock Lesnar.
 Filled in for Michael Cole, who was continue to recovering from injury.
 Graves replaces JBL following the 2016 WWE draft.
 Aries replaced Saxton during cruiserweight matches. 
 Booker T temporarily replaced David Otunga for six weeks while Otunga was filming the movie Katrina''. After the six weeks elapsed, Otunga was quietly moved to the pay-per-view pre-shows while Booker remained on commentary. Booker also fills in for Jonathan Coachman while Coachman was on assignment.
 Jerry Lawler temporarily replaced Booker T for one week while Booker T was stranded in Houston due to Hurricane Harvey. This also doubles as Lawler's special return to commentating since the show was live from Memphis, Tennessee.
 Phillips filled in due to Cole attending his son's wedding. He also filled in due to Braun Strowman's attack on Cole.
 David Otunga temporarily replaced Jonathan Coachman for one week while Coachman was on assignment. This also used as Otunga's return to commentating since has been elapsed from last year's Superstar Shake-up.
 Called the main event during the WCW-branded match between Booker T and Buff Bagwell in Tacoma. This match had received negative reviews.
 Renee Young temporarily replaced Jonathan Coachman for one week while Coachman was on assignment.

Ring announcers

Recurring segments

See also 
 List of WWE SmackDown on-air personalities
 List of WWE Raw guest stars
 List of current champions in WWE

References 

On-air personalities
Raw on-air personalities